Micromisumenops is a genus of spiders in the family Thomisidae. It was first described in 2010 by Tang & Li. , it contains only one Chinese species, Micromisumenops xiushanensis.

References

Thomisidae
Monotypic Araneomorphae genera
Spiders of China